Punjab Legislative Assembly election, 2002 was held in Indian state of Punjab in 2002, to elect 117 members to the Punjab Legislative Assembly. Indian National Congress gained majority of the seats. Amarinder Singh was elected as the Chief Minister.

Results 

|- align=center
!style="background-color:#E9E9E9" class="unsortable"|
!style="background-color:#E9E9E9" align=center|Political Party
!style="background-color:#E9E9E9" |No. of Candidates
!style="background-color:#E9E9E9" |Seats won
!style="background-color:#E9E9E9" |Number of Votes
!style="background-color:#E9E9E9" |% of Votes
|-
| 
|align="left"|Indian National Congress||105||62||3,682,877||35.81%
|-
| 
|align="left"|Shiromani Akali Dal||92||41||3,196,924||31.08%
|-
| 
|align="left"|Bharatiya Janata Party||23||3||583,214||5.67%
|-
| 
|align="left"|Communist Party of India||11||2||220,785||2.15%
|-
| 
|align="left"|Independents||274||9||1,159,552||11.27%
|-
|
|align="left"|Total||923||117|| 10,284,686||
|-
|}

Result by Region

Constituency wise Results

Bye Elections 2002-2007

See also 
1997 Punjab Legislative Assembly election

2007 Punjab Legislative Assembly election

References

Punjab
2002
2002